The Indian School Al Ghubra (ISG) is an independent, co-educational private day school located in the city of Muscat in the Sultanate of Oman. The school was founded in July 1990 by Indian born Omani businessman P Mohamed Ali, the managing director of Galfar Engineering and Contracting.

Mr. B S Bhatnagar was the principal of the school from 1991 to spring 2006. The present principal is Mrs. Papri Ghosh, who succeeded Mr. G. Thangadurai in 2008. The vice principal of the school is G. Sreekumar who took over in 2007.

a. The school offers educational services starting by the CBSE.

IP has been recent additions to the subject list. 
The school also offers languages such as Malayalam, French, Arabic, Sanskrit and Hindi as the Second and Third Languages from grade 6 onward till grade 10.

CBSE Nationals 
The school takes part in the CBSE national level tournaments in athletics, badminton, chess, cricket, football, swimming, table-tennis etc.

Student Council 
The School Council members are elected democratically by the students of each class. The Student Council has two members from each class, a boy and a girl, starting from Grade 6. The office bearers of the Student Council are the Speaker, the Vice President and the President are all elected from the final year students.

Prefectorial body
The prefects are elected by the students. Every year, the office bearers are the President of Student Council, Headboy, Headgirl,Vice President of Student Council, Vice Headboy, Vice Headgirl,  Speaker of Student Council, President of the Round Square, Sports Captain (Girls), Sports Captain (Boys). There is also a body of prefects, whose number vary around 16.

Houses
The students of the school are organized in four houses, which compete against each other in intra-school tournaments, which include sports and quizzing. The houses are named after famous places in Oman. The houses are Muscat House, Nizwa House, Sohar House, and Sur House. Muscat house has been the reigning champions throughout the history of ISG.

History
Originally eight houses competed for the House of the Year award. However, four of the eight houses have ceased to exist. The houses are as follows:
 Muscat
 Nizwa
 Sohar
 Sur

Department of Information Technology (DoIT)
ISG was one of the first schools to incorporate an independent IT department, called the Department of Information Technology or also known as IT department . This allows the school to augment the students existing syllabus with computer education. The department has 164 workstations which are spread over three labs. The department is responsible for maintaining the school's website.

Quiz teams 
The school has produced teams that have won national and international quiz competitions. In 1998, the school won the Times of Oman Quiz and went on to win the All-Asia Bournvita Quiz Contest held in India. The school conducts general knowledge quizzes every month. The school has won the Times Of Oman Inter school Quiz the most number of times, and has held the rolling trophy for a record three years and running.

Principals 
 Mr. B S Bhatnagar (1991–2006)
 Mr. G. Thangadurai (2006-2007)
 Mrs. Papri Ghosh (2008–present)

References

External links

 

Round Square schools
Private schools in Oman
Indian international schools in Oman
Educational institutions established in 1990
1990 establishments in Oman